Rescigno is a surname. Notable people with the surname include:

Giuseppe Rescigno (born 1934), Italian bobsledder
Joseph Rescigno (born 1945), American conductor 
Nicola Rescigno (1916–2008), Italian-American conductor
Xavier Rescigno (1912–2005), American baseball player